Eugene Vincent McAuliffe (November 25, 1918 – February 9, 2000) was an American Career Foreign Service Officer who served as Ambassador Extraordinary and Plenipotentiary to Hungary (1975–1976).  He also served as Deputy Defense Secretary for International Security Affairs (May 6, 1976 – April 1, 1977) and deputy head of the American NATO Mission.

McAuliffe was born in Boston, Massachusetts on November 25, 1918. He served in the Army in World War II, then entered the Foreign Service. He died in Duxbury, Massachusetts on February 9, 2000, at the age of 81.

References

1918 births
2000 deaths
Ambassadors of the United States to Hungary
United States Army personnel of World War II
United States Assistant Secretaries of Defense